Ashton Glacier is a glacier  long, which flows east-southeast from Mount Thompson to the northwest side of Lehrke Inlet, on the east coast of Palmer Land. The glacier was photographed from the air in December 1940 by the United States Antarctic Service (USAS), and was probably seen by the USAS ground survey party which explored this coast. A joint party consisting of members of the Ronne Antarctic Research Expedition and the Falkland Islands Dependencies Survey (FIDS) charted the glacier in 1947. It was named by the FIDS for L. Ashton, a carpenter with the FIDS at the Port Lockroy and Hope Bay bases in 1944–45 and 1945–46, respectively.

References 

Glaciers of Palmer Land